The valley elderberry longhorn beetle (Desmocerus californicus dimorphus) is a subspecies of longhorn beetle native to the riparian forests of the Central Valley of California from Redding to Bakersfield. It is listed as a federally threatened species; a proposal to delist the insect was withdrawn in 2014.

Description
Valley elderberry longhorn beetles are stout-bodied. Males range in length from about 1.25–2.5 cm (½–1 in; measured from the front of the head to the end of the abdomen) with antennae about as long as their bodies. Females are slightly more robust than males, measuring about 1.9–2.5 cm (¾–1 in), with somewhat shorter antennae. Adult males have red-orange elytra (wing covers) with four elongate spots and margins. The red-orange fades to yellow on some museum specimens. Adult females have dark-colored elytra with reddish margins.

The four stages in the animal's life are: egg, larva, pupa, and adult. The species is nearly always found on or close to its host plant, elderberry (Sambucus species). Females lay their eggs on the bark. Larvae hatch and burrow into the stems. The larval stage may last 2 years, after which the larvae enter the pupal stage and transform into adults. Adults are active from March to June, feeding and mating.  Adults have been observed feeding on the leafy foliage of the elderberry plant.

To serve as habitat, the shrubs apparently must have stems  2.5 cm (1 in) or greater in diameter at ground level. Use of the plants by the animal is rarely apparent. Frequently, the only exterior evidence of the shrub's use by the beetle is an exit hole created by the larva just before the pupal stage. Field work along the Cosumnes River and in the Folsom Lake area suggests that larval galleries can be found in elderberry stems with no evidence of exit holes. The larvae either succumb before constructing an exit hole or are not far enough along in the developmental process to construct one.

Males of the valley elderberry longhorn beetle are attracted to (R)-desmolactone, a chemical compound which functions as a sex pheromone or sex attractant for multiple species and subspecies in the cerambycid genus Desmocerus. The compound may be used as a lure for efficient monitoring of the valley elderberry longhorn beetle.

Critical habitat
 Sacramento Zone — An area in the city of Sacramento enclosed on the north by the Route 160 Freeway, on the west and southwest by the Western Pacific railroad tracks, and on the east by Commerce Circle and its extension southward to the railroad tracks
 American River Parkway Zone — An area of the American River Parkway on the south bank of the American River, bounded on the north by latitude 38 37'30" N, and on the South and east by Ambassador Drive and its extension north to latitude 38 37'30" N, River Bend Park, and that portion of the American River Parkway northeast of River Bend Park, west of the Jedediah Smith Memorial Bicycle Trail, and north to a line extended eastward from Palm Drive 
 O'Connor Lakes Ripirain restoration zone sponsored by California's Department of Fish and Game and the wildlife conservation board Location: Sutter and Yuba Counties - 10 miles south of Marysville and Yuba City on the Feather River. Access: Access gained from Star Bend fishing access on Feather River Blvd

Special considerations
Extensive destruction of California's Central Valley riparian forests has occurred during the last 150 years due to agricultural and urban development. According to some estimates, riparian forest in the Central Valley has declined by as much as 89% during that time. The valley elderberry longhorn beetle, though wide-ranging, is in long-term decline due to human activities that have resulted in widespread alteration and fragmentation of riparian habitats, and to a lesser extent, upland habitats, which support the beetle.

The primary threats to survival of the beetle include: 
 loss and alteration of habitat by agricultural conversion
 inappropriate grazing
 levee construction, stream and river channelization, removal of riparian vegetation and rip-rapping of shoreline
 nonnative animals such as the Argentine ant, which may eat the early stages of the beetle
 recreational, industrial and urban development

Insecticide and herbicide use in agricultural areas and along road rights-of-way may be factors limiting the beetle's distribution. The age and quality of individual elderberry shrubs/trees and stands as a food plant for beetle may also be a factor in its limited distribution.

References

Further reading
 Barr, C. 1991. The Distribution, Habitat, and Status of the Valley Elderberry Longhorn Beetle Desmocerus californicus dimorphus. Sacramento, CA. 
 Eng, L. L., 1984. Rare, threatened and endangered invertebrates in California riparian systems. In: California riparian systems Ecology, conservation, and productive management, ed. R. E. Warner and K. M. Hendrix. Berkeley: University of California Press. 
 Thelander, C. ed. 1994. Life on the edge: a guide to California's endangered natural resources. BioSystem Books. Santa Cruz, CA. p 414-415.
 U.C. Berkeley, Essig Museum of Entomology.  California's Endangered Insects. 
 U.S. Fish & Wildlife Service. 1980. Listing the Valley elderberry longhorn beetle as a threatened species with critical habitat. (PDF) Washington, DC. 
 U.S. Fish & Wildlife Service. 1984. Valley elderberry longhorn beetle recovery plan. Portland, Oregon. 
 U.S. Fish and Wildlife Service. 1996. Valley elderberry longhorn beetle consultation with the U.S. Army Corps of Engineers. Sacramento, California. Appendix: Conservation Guidelines for the Valley Elderberry Longhorn Beetle, Updated July 9, 1999.

Lepturinae
Beetles of North America
Endemic fauna of California
ESA threatened species